This was the first edition of the tournament.

Kimmer Coppejans won the title after defeating Maxime Janvier 6–7(8–10), 6–4, 6–3 in the final.

Seeds

Draw

Finals

Top half

Bottom half

References

External links
Main draw
Qualifying draw

Internationaux de Tennis de Toulouse - 1